A tag management system helps manage the lifecycle of digital marketing tags (sometimes referred to as tracking pixels or web beacons), used to track activity on digital properties, such as websites and web applications. As tag management systems have grown in sophistication they've become powerful tools to manage the rich data coming from the interactions between a user, their browser and one or more digital property/s. This data can be fed to marketing and analytics tools. It can also be used to make dynamic changes to the website or application.

Functionality 
Digital marketing tags are used to track usage of web sites, video content, and mobile apps. Such tracking data can support web analytics, campaign analytics, audience measurement, personalization, A/B testing, ad servers, behavioral retargeting, and conversion tracking.

The main advantages of a tag management system is that it allows non-developer types to action a multitude of different tasks on a website or application whilst improving performance by reducing written code. It does this by replacing a multitude of tags - historically managed by a developer - with a single container tag which sits across all areas of the property. The tag management system is then accessed separately (normally via a website) to prioritize and "fire" individual tags as appropriate based on business rules, navigation events and known data. Typical functionality includes testing environment (sandboxing), audit trail and version control, ability to A/B test different solutions, tag deduplication, and role-based access to data. It helps the data analytics to use data easily.

Benefits 
Typically cited benefits of tag management systems include:
 Agility: Reduced reliance on technical resources and reduced dependency on IT cycles confers greater agility to business users.
 Performance: Reduced page load times thanks to asynchronous tag loading, conditional tag loading and tag timeout functionality.
 Cost savings: Ability to deduplicate tags used to attribute commission.
 Data control: Ability to control data leakage to third-parties and comply with data privacy legislation (cookie consent, do not track). Tag managers also provide another layer of abstraction for managing the complexity of large websites. 
 Safe preview: Some tag managers, such as Google Tag Manager and Ensighten, include a preview mode which allows checking for formatting and security issues before deploying tags to production.

Notable providers

 Adobe
 Ensighten
 Google
 Matomo
 Scale8
 Signal
 Tealium
 Yahoo

References

Web analytics